Erkan Zengin (born 5 August 1985) is a Swedish professional footballer who plays as a winger. A full international between 2013 and 2016, he won 21 caps for the Sweden national team and represented his country at UEFA Euro 2016.

Early life
Zengin was born in Kulu, Turkey – but moved to Stockholm, Sweden, together with his Turkish parents when he was a few weeks old. He grew up in Botkyrka and started to play football at age six with the local club Norsborgs IF. In 1994, at age 9, he moved to Hammarby IF.

Club career
In January 2009, Zengin signed a half-year loan contract with Beşiktaş. Beşiktaş had the option to buy him in summer for a fee of €400,000.

On 28 July 2016, Zengin joined Eskişehirspor again.

International career
Zengin played for his birth country Turkey in youth competitions, before choosing to represent the Sweden national team in senior competition, the country in which he grew up.

He made his senior international debut for Sweden on 26 March 2013, playing from start in an away match against Slovakia. He was a squad player for Sweden at Euro 2016, where he came on as a substitute in the last group game against Belgium.

Zengin announced his retirement from international duty following the tournament, having represented Sweden 21 times, scoring 3 goals.

Career statistics

International 

Scores and results list Sweden's goal tally first, score column indicates score after each Zengin goal.

Honours
Beşiktaş
 Süper Lig: 2008–09
 Turkish Cup: 2008–09

References

External links
  (profile 1)
  (profile 2)
 
 
 
 
 
 
 
 

1985 births
Living people
People from Kulu, Konya
Turkish footballers
Swedish footballers
Swedish people of Turkish descent
Association football midfielders
Sweden international footballers
Turkey youth international footballers
Sweden under-21 international footballers
UEFA Euro 2016 players
Hammarby Talang FF players
Hammarby Fotboll players
Beşiktaş J.K. footballers
Eskişehirspor footballers
Trabzonspor footballers
Fatih Karagümrük S.K. footballers
Adana Demirspor footballers
Tuzlaspor players
Allsvenskan players
Süper Lig players
Turkish expatriate footballers
Turkish expatriate sportspeople in Sweden
Expatriate footballers in Turkey
Swedish expatriate footballers
Swedish expatriate sportspeople in Turkey
Fatih Karagümrük S.K. managers